Savithri Sreedharan is an Indian theatre and film actress. She has been a part of several Calicut-based theatre groups for over forty years and made her film debut in 2018 in the film Sudani from Nigeria which earned her a Special Mention at the 66th National Film Awards. Her other major films are Virus (2019) and Dakini (2018).

Personal life

She is permanent professional drama actress last forty years in Malayalam drama world. Her  association was Calicut-based drama theatres such as  Kalimga, Sangamam, Stage Inda, Chiranthana theaters

Filmography

All films are in Malayalam language unless otherwise noted.

Dramas
 Rajyasabha
 Ithu Bhoomiyanu
 Khafar
 Srishti
 Deepasthambham Mahascharyam
 Ijj Nalloru Manissanakan Nokk
 Pakida 12
 Padanilam
 Medapathu
 Akkarapacha
 Aalmarattam
 Karutha Vella
 Nottukal
 Thazhvara
 Thathwamasi
 Vazhiyambalam
 Kshanikkunnu Kudumbasametham

Advertisements
 Double Horse
 Sunlight

Awards
1977 - Kerala State Award for Best Theatre Artist
1993 - Kerala State Award for Best Theatre Artist
2009 - Kerala Sangeetha Nataka Akademi Award for Drama
2018 - National Film Award - Special Mention (Feature Film): Sudani from Nigeria
2018 - Kerala State Film Award for Best Character Actress: Sudani from Nigeria
2018 - Asianet Film Award for Best Supporting Actress: Sudani from Nigeria
2018 - Filmfare Award for Best Supporting Actress – Malayalam: Sudani from Nigeria

References

External links

Living people
Actresses from Kerala
Indian film actresses
Actresses in Malayalam cinema
20th-century Indian actresses
21st-century Indian actresses
Actresses from Kozhikode
Actresses in Malayalam television
Indian stage actresses
Actresses in Malayalam theatre
Year of birth missing (living people)
Special Mention (feature film) National Film Award winners
Recipients of the Kerala Sangeetha Nataka Akademi Award